Ion Neacșu (19 September 1930 – 10 May 1988) was a Romanian footballer.

International career
Ion Neacșu played ten international matches for Romania's national team, making his debut in a friendly game which ended with a 0–2 loss against Sweden. He played four games at the 1958 World Cup qualifiers.

Honours
Petrolul Ploiești
Divizia A: 1957–58, 1958–59

Notes

References

External links

1930 births
1988 deaths
Romanian footballers
Romania international footballers
Association football defenders
Liga I players
Liga II players
FCM Câmpina players
FC Petrolul Ploiești players
Sportspeople from Ploiești